Leaders International Christian School of Manila (or "Leaders-ICS") is located inside of Bonifacio Global City, Taguig, Philippines. The school is currently open for Preschool up to 6th grade and will be expanding in the coming years.

References

Christian schools in the Philippines
International schools in Metro Manila
Education in Bonifacio Global City